The Battle of Bobbili, and the attack on the fort of Bobbili on 24 January 1757, is a significant historical event in Princely state of Vizianagaram, the present day Vizianagaram district of Andhra Pradesh. Tandra Paparayudu was the Army General of Bobbili during the Battle.

Events leading to the Battle
On 23 November 1753, a Paravana of Asif ad-Dawlah Mir Ali Salabat Jang, Subedar of Deccan conceded to  Marquis de Bussy-Castelnau the parganas of Chicacole, Ellore, Rajahmundry etc. with an annual revenue RS.2, 00,000 for the maintenance of the French troops in the Subah in recognition of the help of these Circars amounted up to 10 lakhs of Rupees per year. de Bussy helped Salabat Jang to be the Subedar of Deccan. The agreement (Treaty of Aurangabad) made between the French and Salabat Jang in Aurangabad bears the signature of Said Loukshur, Minister of Salabat Jang. Actually, he was one of the key sub-ordinates of Dupleix who helped him in expanding French activities in Northern Circars and along the Coromandel Coast. Men in his command also included the famous Hyder Ali of Mysore.

In 1756 Marquis de Bussy visited Rajahmundry. Vijayaramaraju  had given a warm welcome to Bussy by going in front at Rajahmundry. There were differences between Vizianagaram Maharaja and the ruler of Bobbili, which led to the battle of Bobbili starting on 23 January 1757. The war was fought by Bussy and the Raja of Vizianagaram-Pusapati Vijayarama Gajapati Raju I (Ruled 1710 – Died 1757) (Founder of Vizianagaram. During the battle the Bobbili fort was totally destroyed and many Bobbili soldiers died. There is still a street named after Bussy in Yanam.

The battle
On January 24, 1757, Bussy with his army and the army of Pusapati Vijayarama Gajapati Raju I in tow marched towards the Bobbili fort. The army of Gopalakrishna Ranga Rao was no match for the combined armies of Marquis de Bussy-Castelnau and Pusapati Vijayarama Gajapati Raju I. Gopalakrishna Rayudu was led by his Army General Tandra Paparayudu and his army, who put up a brave fight till the end. The French General knew that it would be impossible to reach Bobbili via Rajam as Paparayudu was camping there and took a different route to reach the fort. Rani Mallamma Devi, wife of Ranga Rao and sister of Paparayudu, sent a message to him on coming to know of the enemy's advance towards the fort. However, the enemy intercepted the courier and the message did not reach Paparayudu.

Meanwhile, Ranga Rao and his men after defending the fort for several hours realised that the enemy could not be contained for long. Ranga Rao did not want the women and children in the fort to be at the mercy of the enemy. He ordered them to be sacrificed. Rani Mallamma Devi committed suicide. When the news reached him, Tandra Paparayudu rushed to the demolished fort and saw his sister and the entire family lying on the ground in a pool of blood. Seething with vengeance he took an oath to kill Pusapati Vijayarama Gajapati Raju I.

Pusapati Vijayarama Gajapati Raju I was camping in a Tent, basking in the glory of the war, which annihilated his enemy. Tandra Paparayudu along with Devulapalli Peddanna and Buddaraju Venkaiah managed to reach the tent in which Pusapati Vijayarama Gajapati Raju I was sleeping. Paparayudu gained entry through the rear of the tent, while the other two stood guard at the entrance. He woke up Pusapati Vijayarama Gajapati Raju I  shouting "Puli, Puli... Bobbili Puli" (Tiger, Tiger... The Tiger of Bobbili). Pusapati Vijayarama Gajapati Raju I tried to divert his attention saying that he should not belittle their clan as cowards gaining entry through the backdoor. "You have wiped out our entire clan through dubious means and have no right to get ethical treatment," replied Paparayudu and stabbed him repeatedly in the chest. Hearing the commotion, the bodyguard of Pusapati Vijayarama Gajapati Raju I tried to enter the tent but was killed by Peddanna, who was guarding the entrance. The entire army was alerted and Paparayudu and the other two killed themselves.

In popular culture
Bobbili Yuddham
Tandra Paparayudu

References

1757 in India
History of Andhra Pradesh
Battles involving the Indian kingdoms
Conflicts in 1757